Science World may refer to:

Science World (magazine), a magazine for children grades 6–10 published by Scholastic Corporation
ScienceWorld, a science website
Science World (Vancouver), a science centre in Vancouver, British Columbia, Canada